Carl Junker (18 June 1827 – 17 May 1882) was an Austrian engineer and architect. His construction projects include Miramare Castle in Trieste and the First Vienna Mountain Spring Pipeline.

Life 

Carl Junker was born as the son of a tenant farmer in 1827 in Saubersdorf in Lower Austria. From 1842 to 1845 he studied at the Imperial-Royal Polytechnic Institute and became an engineer.

Throughout his career he devoted himself mainly to the construction of aqueducts and water pipes. In 1847 he was involved in the construction of the Suez Canal under Alois Negrelli. In 1855 he took over the plans for the construction of the aqueduct of Aurisina in Trieste.

In 1856 he was instructed by archduke of Maximilian I of Mexico, the brother of Emperor Franz Joseph I of Austria, with the construction of the Miramare Castle in Grignano near Trieste.

In 1860 he took over the supervision of a church in Bar in present-day Montenegro. Pope Pius IX granted him the Order of St. Gregory the Great for the project.

Between 1860 and 1861 he was in charge of the construction of the aqueduct of the military arsenal in Pula. In 1864 he worked on Vienna's Emperor Franz Joseph water supply system on the grounds of his experience in hydrography. He was the lead chief engineer in the design and construction management from the springs to the elevated tank at the Rosenhügel in Hietzing, the 13th municipal District of Vienna. Emperor Franz Joseph I awarded Junker the Order of Franz Joseph for his work on this project.

Junker died in Vienna on 17 May 1882.

Key construction projects 

 Miramare Castle near Trieste (1856–1860)
 First Vienna Mountain Spring Pipeline (1865)

Publications 

 Carl Junker (1873): Die Wasserversorgung der Stadt Wien, in: R. Stadler, Wien
 Carl Junker (1985): Projekt der Zuleitung des Recca Flusses von St. Canzian, Trieste

References 

 Junker Karl. In: Österreichisches Biographisches Lexikon 1815–1950. Volume 3, Verlag der Österreichischen Akademie der Wissenschaften, Vienna 1965, p. 153 (Direct references on pages 153 and 154).

1827 births
1882 deaths
Austrian civil engineers
19th-century Austrian architects